Mohamed Al-Wabran (born 1964) is a Saudi taekwondo practitioner. He competed in the men's finweight at the 1988 Summer Olympics.

References

External links
 

1964 births
Date of birth unknown
Place of birth unknown
Living people
Olympic taekwondo practitioners
Taekwondo practitioners at the 1988 Summer Olympics
Saudi Arabian sportsmen
20th-century Saudi Arabian people